The 1907 Maryland gubernatorial election took place on November 5, 1907.

Incumbent Governor Edwin Warfield did not seek re-election.

Democratic candidate Austin Lane Crothers defeated Republican candidate George R. Gaither, Jr.

General election

Candidates
Austin Lane Crothers, Democratic, associate judge for the Second Judicial Circuit
George Riggs Gaither, Jr., Republican, former Attorney General of Maryland
Ira Culp, Socialist, school principal
James W. Frizzell, Prohibition

Results

References

Gubernatorial
1907
Maryland